, is a Japanese manga series written and illustrated by Synecdoche about an elf girl trying to lose weight. It was originally serialized on Wani Books' Comic Gum website from December 2016 to May 2021, with its individual chapters collected into eight tankōbon volumes. After Wani Books' license to the series expired, a continuation manga titled  started serialization in Akita Shoten's monthly seinen magazine, Dokodemo Young Champion, in October 2021, with its individual chapters collected into two tankōbon volumes. Both manga are licensed for English release in North America by Seven Seas Entertainment.

Plot
The series follows human Tomoatsu Naoe, a massage therapist, who helps a chubby elf lose weight so she can be able to return to her home world. Because of this, many other overweight mystical beings come seeking his help.

Characters

An osteopath who works at Smiley Bore, a relaxation clinic.

The director of Smiley Bore.

An otherworldly elf who became fat from eating too many French fries in the human world.

A Dark Elf who works at the convenience store "11-Eleven". She is troubled by her big butt caused by long hours of standing and lack of exercise.

A mermaid who works at a fish shop. She can maintain a human form by using secret medicine. She suffers from sagging arms due to not being able to swim because of her busy work schedule.

She owns a flower shop. She is troubled by the excessive growth of flowers on her head due to continuous sunny days.

An ogre who becomes fat by excessive drinking in the human world.

A lycanthrope who gained weight due to the large amount of food she receives from humans as a tribute.

An Orc who acquired a slender system by dieting and swimming.

An otherworldly creature who gains flabby cheeks by eating too many sweets obtained from children.

Manga
Plus-Sized Elf is written and illustrated by Synecdoche. The manga was published digitally by Wani Books on their Comic Gum website from December 2016 until May 2021, at the manga's 45th chapter, when Wani Books' license with the series ended and Synecdoche took over posting the 46th and 47th chapters on Twitter, before announcing a hiatus until fall 2021 in order to find a new publisher. On September 1, 2021, after revealing that Akita Shoten would be taking over as the series' publisher, Synecdoche ended the first manga and started a sequel titled Shin Plus-Sized Elf, which continues the story. Plus-Sized Elf'''s chapters have been collected into individual tankōbon volumes across both series. Eight volumes of the original manga were published from June 26, 2017 to November 18, 2021. As of February 2023, two volumes of the continuation has been published.

Seven Seas Entertainment acquired Plus-Sized Elf'' for English publication in North America on November 17, 2017. On March 8, 2023, they acquired its sequel.

Volume list

Plus-Sized Elf

Shin Plus-Sized Elf

References

External links
 Plus-Sized Elf official manga website at Seven Seas Entertainment 
 Plus-Sized Elf official manga website at Comic Gum 
 Plus-Sized Elf official manga website at Akita Shoten 
 Shin Elf-san wa Yaserarenai. official manga website at Akita Shoten 
 

Akita Shoten manga
Comedy anime and manga
Elves in popular culture
Japanese webcomics
Seinen manga
Seven Seas Entertainment titles
Wani Books manga
Webcomics in print